Anthony Koura (born 6 May 1993) is a professional footballer who plays as a striker. Born in France, he represented the country internationally on junior levels, and chose to represent Burkina Faso on senior level.

Club career
On 9 June 2011, after featuring with the Le Mans's reserve team in the Championnat de France Amateur for two straight seasons, Koura signed his first professional contract agreeing to a three-year deal. He was subsequently promoted to the senior team permanently for the 2011–12 season and was assigned the number 11 shirt. He made his professional debut on 26 August 2011 appearing as a substitute in a 1–0 league defeat to Châteauroux.

In early July 2016, Koura signed a three-year contract with newly promoted Ligue 1 club AS Nancy.

In January 2019, he moved to FC Lausanne-Sport.

International career
Koura is a French youth international at various levels. With the under-17 team, Koura played at the 2010 UEFA European Under-17 Championship.

Koura is of Burkinabé descent, and was called up several times to the Burkina Faso national team. He made his debut for Burkina Faso in a 2–0 friendly loss to Morocco on 24 March 2017.

Career statistics

Club

References

External links
 
 
 
 
 

1993 births
Living people
Footballers from Le Mans
Association football forwards
Citizens of Burkina Faso through descent
Burkinabé footballers
Burkina Faso international footballers
French footballers
France youth international footballers
French sportspeople of Burkinabé descent
Sportspeople of Burkinabé descent
Le Mans FC players
Luzenac AP players
Nîmes Olympique players
AS Nancy Lorraine players
FC Lausanne-Sport players
Neuchâtel Xamax FCS players
Ligue 2 players
Championnat National players
Ligue 1 players
Swiss Challenge League players
Burkinabé expatriate footballers
Expatriate footballers in Switzerland
Burkinabé expatriate sportspeople in Switzerland
21st-century Burkinabé people